Lumley Franklin (1808 – 3 August 1873) was the 2nd mayor of Victoria, British Columbia.  He was born in Liverpool, England, the son of a successful banker. Lumley emigrated from London to New York City in 1845 to establish his career in the U.S. He was a successful business man before he moved to San Francisco in 1854 to join his brothers Edward and Selim during the California Gold Rush. Lumley's cousins, Maurice and Lewis Franklin, had already left San Francisco to establish the Franklin House in San Diego, but frequently visited San Francisco. 

Lumley stayed in California until 1858 when he and younger brother Selim (1814–1884) moved up to Victoria for the Fraser Canyon Gold Rush. In Victoria, Lumley and Selim established Franklin & Company, Auctioneers and Land Agents, at the foot of Yates Street. Because they were English citizens, they were appointed by Governor James Douglas as the first government auctioneers for British Columbia. Franklin & Company took out full page adds in the daily newspaper, The British Colonist, to advertise items up for auction which usually included properties in the area, furniture, cattle, books, photographs and carriages. In addition, the Franklins bought up properties around Victoria for their own ownership, including a cattle sale yard on Fort Street. One of Lumley's properties in the Seattle, Washington area became the subject of a US Supreme Court ruling in 1896: Hanford vs. Davies.

Franklin achieved the title of Esquire and was a founding member of the Freemason lodge in Victoria. He was also a member of the grand jury that heard the trial of Tshuanahusset regarding the murder of William Robinson. In June 1867, Lumley was selected to the Board of Education of Vancouver Island along Dr. Powell (Chairman), David Higgins, Francis Garesche, and Thomas Wood.

Franklin Street in Victoria was named after Lumley Franklin. The Franklin River on Vancouver Island was named for his brother Selim.

Mayor of Victoria
In November 1865 Lumley became the second mayor of Victoria, the same year his brother Selim left his seat on the Provincial Legislature. Lumley was nominated by the first mayor of Victoria, Thomas Harris. Lumley's opponent was Mr. Copland, who he defeated by a vote of 78 to 73. During his term in office, Franklin had the privilege of presiding over the installation of the telegraph cable linking Victoria directly to England. He received many congratulatory letters from other cities such as London, England and San Francisco on having Victoria connected via telegraph. He responded to each of these letters with a thank you note in return. Throughout his term Franklin was well liked and "urged to stand for re-election" by his fellow councillors and the general public. He declined the offer because he wanted to travel and enjoy his wealth.

Composer and co-founder of Victoria Philharmonic Society
Shortly after arriving in Victoria, Lumley and Selim Franklin helped found the Victoria Philharmonic Society, both served as executives in the organization, and both sang in the musical performances. The Chairman of the Society was Chief-Justice Begbie, who sang opera. The Conductor was Chief of Police John Bayley. Other founders included Postmaster General Arthur Bushby, Alexander Main, Augustus Pemberton, A.C. Anderson, Joseph Porter, James Leigh, B.W. Pearse, and James Crowly.

Lumley is listed in a history of music in Victoria as the Composer/Mayor. According to The Knickerbocker Magazine in 1849, Lumley was involved in composer circles, including opera singer, director and composer Signor Giuseppe de Begnis of London and New York, and Thomas Moore of London. De Begnis described Lumley as being an excellent judge of music and possessing accomplished vocal skills, which given his credentials is a supreme compliment. De Begnis was a world-class opera singer who worked with Rossini in Italy and was married to the talented opera soprano Giuseppina Ronzi de Begnis
(Claudine de Begnis). Signor De Begnis dedicated one of his works to Lumley before he died in New York in  August 1849.

Death and estate
Franklin enjoyed travelling, and frequently travelled by steamship down to San Francisco. It was on a journey down south to deal with his deceased brother's estate, Edward Franklin, that he suffered a severe stroke on July 11, 1873. He became paralysed and eventually died on August 3, 1873 in San Francisco at age 65.

His brother, Selim Franklin, was the executor of the estate, which was settled in San Francisco, CA, as the place of Lumley's death. Lumley was most likely buried in Victoria, BC.

Lumley Franklin's estate was divided up as follows:
1/10 – Sarah Franklin (sister)
1/20 – Maria Ashton (sister)
1/10 – P. Lewis of Naples (brother)
3/20 – David Lewis of London (brother)
5/20 – Selim (brother)
1/10 – Walter Lewis (brother)
3/20 – to the children of Frank (brother)
1/10 to Elise Reynolds (sister?) and her son, William.

See also
List of mayors of Victoria, British Columbia
Governor James Douglas of BC
Chief-Justice Begbie of BC
Colony of Vancouver Island
United Colonies of Vancouver Island and British Columbia
Cariboo Gold Rush
Fraser Canyon Gold Rush
Fort Victoria (British Columbia)
Rock Creek Gold Rush

References

Sources
British Columbia Archives
Government Records and Historical Manuscripts-Old System, NW 645 F8 32c.
Colonial Correspondence-inward, A E C86 C86 F851.
Colonial Correspondence-outward, E B F85, 1867.
Personal Portraits, Box 88 #5583.
The Victoria Daily Standard, 1873, Death Notices
Vancouver Island Board of Education*
A HISTORY OF THE EARLY DAYS OF FREEMASONRY IN BRITISH COLUMBIA by Bro. William G. Gamble
History of British Columbia, 1792-1887 By Hubert Howe Bancroft, William Nemos, Alfred Bates
Victoria Gazette, Feb 1, 1859 - Jan 29 founding of the Victoria Philharmonic Society
Lumley's subscription to The Occident - 1845 in NYC
The Knickerbocker: Or, New-York Monthly Magazine edited by Charles Fenno Hoffman, Timothy Flint, Lewis Gaylord Clark, Kinahan Cornwallis, John Holmes, page 176
The Concise Oxford Dictionary of Opera, (Oxford: 1980) p. 124.
A documentary history of music in Victoria, British Columbia, Vol. I: 1850-1899, McIntosh, Robert Dale, Victoria, BC: University of Victoria, 1981, 304 p.
British Columbia Archives
MS-0180 LANGLEY, Alfred John.  1820-1896, Victoria; druggist. Originals, 1858–1915, 18 cm
 Who's Who in Jewish History By Joan Comay, Lavinia Cohn-Sherbok, p. 133

External links
 Biography at the Dictionary of Canadian Biography Online
 List of Victoria BC mayors
 Who Killed William Robinson; Lumley bio
 Franklin Brothers of San Diego by David Stern (Lumley's cousins)

1808 births
1873 deaths
Jewish mayors of places in Canada
Mayors of Victoria, British Columbia
19th-century Canadian Jews